KDTR (103.3 FM, "Trail 103.3") is a commercial radio station licensed to Florence, Montana, and serving the Missoula, Montana area, owned by Missoula Broadcasting Company, LLC. KDTR airs an Adult Album Alternative music format.

External links
Trail 103.3's Official Website

DTR
Adult album alternative radio stations in the United States
Radio stations established in 2005
2005 establishments in Montana